Ruth Egri (1911–1996) was an American artist, painter, muralist, educator, and illustrator of Hungarian-Jewish descent who worked in the Federal Art Project and in the WPA New Reading Materials Program during the New Deal. She is known for her mural at Lincoln Hospital (Bronx, New York), and for teaching mural painting at the Spokane Art Center, Washington.

Education
Egri studied at the National Academy of Design, the Art Students League of New York, and the Master Institute of the Roerich Museum with Howard Giles.

Family
Egri's parents were Ilona and playwright Lajos Egri and she had multiple brothers. She painted and exhibited in Taos, NM with one of her brothers, Ted Egri.

Career
On top of all her art projects, Egri was also an educator who taught courses at the Spokane Art Center in Washington and the WPA's New Reading Materials Program, sponsored by the NYC Board of Education. Egri was most interested in making art that primarily expressed the female figure.

Works
Egri's art works that have been discovered upon her death include:
2 sketchbooks
14 loose sketches
21 drawings
13 watercolors
She also painted an exhibit in Taos, New Mexico with her brother Ted Egri.

Appearances
Her illustrations appeared in three children's books.

References

Further reading
"Medical murals." Direction 1 (June 1938): cover, 14–15. Photo essay on murals with medical themes in hospitals by Eric Mose and Ruth Egri (Lincoln Hospital, NYC), and Rudolph Crimi (Harlem Hospital). Cover photograph of Mose at work.

External links
Painting by Ruth Egri

1911 births
1996 deaths
Artists from Spokane, Washington
American women painters
20th-century American painters
American muralists
American women illustrators
American illustrators
20th-century American women artists
Women muralists
Federal Art Project artists